Papyrus 79 (in the Gregory-Aland numbering), designated by 𝔓79, is a copy of the New Testament in Greek. It is a papyrus manuscript of the Epistle to the Hebrews. The surviving texts of Hebrews are verses 10:10-12,28-30.

The manuscript palaeographically has been assigned to the 7th century.

The text was not corrected. The letters have Coptic shape.

 Text 
The Greek text of this codex is a representative of the Alexandrian text-type. Aland placed it in Category II.

 Location 
It is currently housed at the Staatliche Museen zu Berlin (Inv. no. 6774) in Berlin.

See also 

 List of New Testament papyri

References

Further reading 

 Kurt Treu, Neue neutestamentliche Fragmente der Berliner Papyrussammlung, Archiv für Papyrusforschung 18 (Berlin: 1966), pp. 37–48. 
 M. Mees, Einige Verse aus den Hebräerbrief nach einem neugefundeten Papyrus, Orient Press I (Rome: 1970), pp. 43–46. 
 G. H. R. Horsley, New Documents Illustrating Early Christianity 2 (Macquarie University, 1982) pp. 125–140.

Images 

 Leaf from 𝔓79 recto 
 Leaf from 𝔓79 verso

New Testament papyri
7th-century biblical manuscripts
Papyri of the Berlin State Museums
Epistle to the Hebrews papyri